Irvin William Studer (15 November 1900 – 1 June 1997) was a Liberal party member of the House of Commons of Canada. He was born in St. Cloud, Minnesota, United States and became a farmer by career.

Studer was elected at the Maple Creek riding in the 1949 general election, after a previous unsuccessful attempt there in 1945. He was re-elected there in 1949. After electoral district changes, Studer became the Liberal candidate in the merged Swift Current—Maple Creek riding where he was returned to Parliament in 1953 and 1957. In the 1958 election, Studer was defeated by Jack McIntosh of the Progressive Conservative party. Studer made two further unsuccessful attempts to unseat McIntosh in the 1962 and 1963 elections.

External links
 

1900 births
1997 deaths
American emigrants to Canada
Farmers from Saskatchewan
Liberal Party of Canada MPs
Members of the House of Commons of Canada from Saskatchewan
Politicians from St. Cloud, Minnesota